The Saanich or  (Xwsenəč) are indigenous nations from the north coast of the Gulf and San Juan Islands, southern Vancouver Island and the southern edge of the Lower Mainland in British Columbia.

Saanich bands
 – Malahat First Nation
 – Pauquachin
 – Tsawout
 – Tsartlip
 – Tseycum First Nation

Tribal school

Four of the Saanich First Nations, Tsartlip, Pauquachin, Tseycum and Tsawout, created the  Tribal School in 1989. It holds classes from preschool to grade 10, with classes for adults in the adult centre next door to the high school where , the  language, and  culture are taught along with the provincial curriculum. The school is also a venue for community events.

See also
 Saanich language
 Coast Salish peoples

References

Further reading
 Bill, Adriane; Cayou, Roxanne; & Jim, Jacqueline. (2003). NET'̸'E NEḰA'̸' SḴELÁLṈEW'̲' [One green tree]. Victoria, B.C.: First Peoples' Cultural Foundation & L̵ÁU,WELṈEW̲ Tribal School. .
 Mithun, Marianne. (1999). The languages of Native North America. Cambridge: Cambridge University Press.  (hbk); .
 Montler, Timothy. (1996). Languages and dialects in Straits Salishan. Proceedings of the International Conference on Salish and Neighboring Languages, 31, 249–256.
 Montler, Timothy. (1999). Language and dialect variation in Straits Salishan. Anthropological linguistics, 41 (4), 462–502.
 YELḰÁTT̵E [Claxton, Earl, Sr.]; & STOLC̸EL̵ [Elliot, John, Sr.]. (1994). Reef Net Technology of the Saltwater People. Brentwood Bay, B.C.: Saanich Indian School Board.

External links
 An Outline of the Morphology and Phonology of Saanich, North Straits Salish (Timothy Montler's site)
 Saanich Classified Word List (Timothy Montler's site)
 SENĆOŦEN (Saanich, Northern Straits Salish) (Chris Harvey's Native Language, Font & Keyboard)
 Saanich Indian School Board
 SENĆOŦEN Welcome page (First Voices)
 ȽÁU,WELṈEW̱ Tribal School

Native American tribes in Washington (state)
First Nations in British Columbia